Lewis Stanford Seiden (August 1, 1934 in Chicago, Illinois—July 26, 2007 in Chicago, Illinois) was an American pharmacologist and professor at the University of Chicago.

Early life and education
Seiden was born in Chicago on August 1, 1934, where he grew up in the South Shore neighborhood. After graduating from high school, he received a full scholarship to the University of Chicago, where he had intended to study medicine. However, in 1950, when he was about to graduate from high school, he developed dystonia; he resumed studies at the University of Chicago the following year after recovering. He continued to struggle with dystonia for the rest of his life. He received his A.B. from the University of Chicago in 1956, where he also received his S.B. in 1958 and his Ph.D. in 1962. After receiving his Ph.D., he did postdoctoral research in the lab of Arvid Carlsson at the University of Goteborg in Sweden for two years (1962–3), and then did another postdoc with Keith Killam from 1964 to 1965 at Stanford University.

Career
Seiden joined the faculty at the University of Chicago in 1963 as a research associate, and returned as an instructor in 1965. He became a full professor there in 1977, and remained on the faculty there until he retired.

Research
Seiden was known for his work in neuropharmacology and the effects of drugs on the brain, especially amphetamine. He also researched the effects of ecstasy on brain cells, research which influenced the Drug Enforcement Administration to name it a schedule 1 drug.

Honors and awards
Seiden was a fellow of the American Association for the Advancement of Science and of the American Psychological Association. In 1999, he received an honorary doctorate in medicine from the University of Goteborg. In 2002, he received the University of Chicago’s Gold Key Award.

References

1934 births
2007 deaths
American pharmacologists
Neuropharmacologists
University of Chicago faculty
Fellows of the American Association for the Advancement of Science
Fellows of the American Psychological Association
University of Chicago alumni
Scientists from Chicago